Puerto Rico Highway 190 (PR-190) is a road located in Carolina, Puerto Rico. This highway begins at its intersection with PR-26 in Cangrejo Arriba and ends at its junction with PR-3 and PR-8887 between Sabana Abajo and San Antón barrios.

Major intersections

See also

 List of highways numbered 190

References

External links
 

190
Carolina, Puerto Rico